This is a list of submissions to the 44th Academy Awards for Best Foreign Language Film. The Academy Award for Best Foreign Language Film was created in 1956 by the Academy of Motion Picture Arts and Sciences to honour non-English-speaking films produced outside the United States. The award is handed out annually, and is accepted by the winning film's director, although it is considered an award for the submitting country as a whole. Countries are invited by the Academy to submit their best films for competition according to strict rules, with only one film being accepted from each country.

For the 44th Academy Awards, twenty films were submitted in the category Academy Award for Best Foreign Language Film. Bulgaria and Canada submitted films for consideration for the first time. Japanese film director Akira Kurosawa gained his first nomination for the award (although he had received an honorary award at the 24th Academy Awards in 1951 for Rashomon) for Dodes'ka-den, a film which was a critical and commercial failure in his native Japan. The highlighted titles were the five nominated films, which came from Israel, Italy, Japan, Sweden and the USSR. The Oscar went to The Garden of the Finzi-Continis, a drama about an aristocratic Jewish family in Italy. France, which received 27 nominations between 1957 and 1991, failed to receive an Oscar nomination for only the fourth time since the inauguration of the Foreign Language Film award.

Submissions

References

Sources
 Margaret Herrick Library, Academy of Motion Picture Arts and Sciences

44